"Have You Ever Been Lonely? (Have You Ever Been Blue?)" is a popular song with music by Peter De Rose and lyrics by Billy Hill (writing under the name of George Brown), published in 1932. It has been recorded by many singers, becoming a standard.

Version history

Jim Reeves and Patsy Cline "duet" version
The most familiar version of "Have You Ever Been Lonely?" is an electronically created "duet" featuring country music singers, Jim Reeves and Patsy Cline, who had both died in separate plane crashes (Cline in 1963, Reeves in 1964) and had never recorded together during their lifetimes. In 1961, both singers recorded their own solo versions of the song and released it to various albums.

In 1981, Owen Bradley – who was Cline's original producer – lifted their solo vocal performances off their original stereo tapes, synchronized them and recorded a new backing track. The song was released in the fall of 1981, and in January 1982 became a No. 5 hit on the Billboard Hot Country Singles chart, and a No. 1 hit on the RPM Magazine Country Singles chart.

Other versions
1933: Ted Lewis, Ray Noble 
1949: Ernest Tubb, a #2 hit on the Most Played Juke Box Folk Records chart.
1955: Jaye P. Morgan, Karen Chandler, and Jerry Cooper
1956: Buddy Holly, unreleased until after his death 
1960: Teresa Brewer
1960: The Browns with Jim Ed Brown
1962: Warner Mack
1964: Caravelles
1965: Bobby Vinton
1966: Dave Dudley
1967: Jim Ed Brown (without The Browns)

Many others not listed, such as Eddy Arnold have also recorded the song for album release without releasing it as a single.

References

1932 songs
1949 singles
1981 singles
Songs written by Billy Hill (songwriter)
Songs with music by Peter DeRose
Ernest Tubb songs
Jim Reeves songs
Patsy Cline songs
Teresa Brewer songs
The Browns songs
Male–female vocal duets